Piriápolis is a city in the Maldonado Department of Uruguay. It is an important summer resort in the country, predating the larger and better known resort town of Punta del Este. Because it is mainly used as a resort, it has a relatively small permanent population for a city of its size.

Piriápolis is also the name of the municipality to which the city belongs. It includes the following zones: Piriápolis, Playa Grande, Playa Hermosa, Playa Verde, Punta Colorada, San Francisco, Punta Negra, Sauce de Portezuelo, Ocean Park, Barra de Portezuelo, La Capuera, Puntas de la Sierra, La Falda, Miramar, Colonia V. Suárez, Sierras del Tirol.

Geography
It is located on the coast of Río de la Plata, on Route 10 and its intersection with Route 37.

History 
Piriápolis was founded on 5 November 1890 as El Balneario del Porvenir (the Resort of the Future). In 1890, businessman Francisco Piria had bought a very big stretch of land, including the hills Cerro Pan de Azúcar, Cerro del Inglés and Cerro del Toro, all the way south to the beach. In 1897 he finished the construction of his personal residence, Piria´s Castle, in 1905 the construction of "Hotel Piriápolis", today known as "Colonia Escolar de Vacaciones", in 1910 he constructed the coastal avenue Rambla de los Argentinos finished in 1916. From 1920 to 1930 he constructed the Argentino Hotel, one of the biggest hotels of South America of the times.  When Piria died in 1933, his natural and legal children started fighting each other over the inheritance.

On 10 September 1937, the status of the populated centre was elevated to "Pueblo" (village) by the Act of Ley Nº 9.687. On 21 June 1960 its status was further elevated to "Ciudad" (city) by the Act of Ley Nº 12.736.

Population
In 2011 Piriápolis had a population of 8,830 permanent inhabitants and 8,489 dwellings. According to the Intendencia Departamental de Maldonado, the municipality of Piriápolis has a population of 14,000.

 
Source: Instituto Nacional de Estadística de Uruguay

Places of interest 

The city is centered on the Rambla de los Argentinos, a waterfront promenade. With a tourism-centered economy, Piriápolis has opulent hotels, large casinos, an active nightlife scene, and public parks. The Templo de San Antonio, situated atop one of the hills surrounding the city, can be reached by chair lift and offers a panoramic view of the coast.  For more adventurous travelers, Uruguay's third-highest point, the Cerro Pan de Azúcar, can be found 10 km outside of town. The peak presents a challenging climb as well as a nature reserve.  Boat tours and saltwater fishing are available at the Piriápolis port.

The Castle of Piria, near Piriápolis, is open to the public. The poet Julio Herrera y Reissig resided at the Castle for a period.

Places of worship
 Parish Church of the Immaculate Conception and St. John Vianney (Roman Catholic)

In fiction
The Uruguayan film Whisky is partly set in Piriápolis.
Juan Grompone's mystery novel Asesinato en el hotel de baños is set in Piriápolis.

See also 
 Punta del Este

References

External links

Portal de Piriápolis
Information on Piriápolis, Maldonado 
Piriápolis, in Maldonado Hall Town official website 
Tourist Information about Piriápolis 
www.piriapolis.com
Article on Piriápolis, Official Portal of the Uruguayan Government
INE map of Piriápolis, Punta Colorada and Punta Negra
Hotels in Piriápolis

 
Populated places in the Maldonado Department
Seaside resorts in Uruguay
Port cities and towns in Uruguay
Populated places established in 1893
1893 establishments in Uruguay
Ports and harbours of Uruguay